Ornithuroscincus shearmani is a species of skink found in Papua New Guinea.

References

Ornithuroscincus
Reptiles described in 2021
Reptiles of Papua New Guinea
Skinks of New Guinea